The 1901 Rhode Island gubernatorial election was held on November 5, 1901. Incumbent Republican William Gregory defeated Democratic nominee Lucius F. C. Garvin with 53.64% of the vote.

General election

Candidates
Major party candidates
William Gregory, Republican
Lucius F. C. Garvin, Democratic 

Other candidates
William E. Brightman, Prohibition
James P. Reid, Socialist Labor

Results

References

1901
Rhode Island
1901 Rhode Island elections